A Summer to Remember (Ljeto za sjećanje) is a Croatian film directed by Bruno Gamulin. It was released in 1990.

External links
 

1990 films
Croatian drama films
1990s Croatian-language films
Yugoslav drama films